Michel Fourquin (September 30, 1791 – October 27, 1861) was a farmer and political figure in Canada East. He represented Yamaska in the Legislative Assembly of the Province of Canada from 1848 to 1851. His surname also appears as Fourquin dit Léveillé.

He was born in Yamaska, Lower Canada, the son of Joseph Léveillé and Marguerite Lasalle. Fourquin owned a farm at Yamaska. He was married three times: first to Catherine Parenteau in 1815, then to Suzanne Chouinard in 1825 and finally to Geneviève Leclerc in 1859. He was an unsuccessful candidate for a seat in the assembly in 1844 and was defeated when he ran for reelection in 1851. Fourquin drowned in Lavallière Bay at the age of 70.

References 
 

1791 births
1861 deaths
Members of the Legislative Assembly of the Province of Canada from Canada East
Deaths by drowning in Canada
Accidental deaths in Quebec
People from Montérégie